Tiger Brands Limited is a South African packaged goods company. In addition to the company's South African operations, Tiger Brands has direct and indirect interests in international food businesses in Chile, Zimbabwe, Mozambique, Nigeria, Kenya, and Cameroon. Tiger Brands is South Africa's largest food company.

History

Jacob Frankel with help from Joffe Marks founded Tiger Oats Limited in 1921. Tiger Brands Limited was formerly known as Tiger Oats Limited and began as a family business. 

Originally known as Tiger Oats, Tiger Brand's first product was a breakfast oatmeal brand called Jungle Oats. Jungle Oats are still produced by the brand. It was first conceived by Frankel towards the end of the 19th century and was finally launched in 1925. Tiger Oat's first mill was opened in Moorreesburg, Western Cape. A second mill was opened in Maitland, Cape Town when demand outgrew the Moorreesburg mill's capacity in 1930. The Moorreesburg mill was abandoned in about 1987. In March 1982 Barlow bought a considerable share of Tiger Oats.

In 1988 SPAR South Africa became a wholly owned subsidiary of Tiger Oats, however it was unbundled and listed as a separate company in 2004. During the late 1990s Tiger Oats went through a period of rapid expansion. It bought out other large companies and competitors such as Imperial Cold Storage and Supply Company , a food packaging company (in October 1998) and pharmaceutical company Adcock Ingram for R3.4bn in 1999. After the buyouts Tiger Oats was renamed Tiger Brands. In July 2008 Adcock Ingram was unbundled from Tiger Brands.

Tiger Brands Limited's subcompany, Tiger Food Brands Ltd merged with Bromor Foods (Pty) Ltd, which owns the Super Juice carbonated drink. On 1 October 2009, the company acquired Crosse & Blackwell's mayonnaise business for an undisclosed amount.

In 2008 Tiger Brands launched an aggressive expansion program into the rest of Africa.  In the process the company bought a controlling stake in a number of food processing businesses in Nigeria, Kenya, Ethiopia, and Cameroon.

This included a R1.5 billion purchase of 65.7% in Dangote Flour Mills in October 2012, Nigeria's second largest milling operation. This and other investments in Africa proved to be costly and unproductive.  Over capacity in the Nigerian market led to an operating loss of R2.7 billion by the time Tiger sold back the operation to Dangote for a token one US dollar three years later in 2015.  Management issues in Tiger's Kenya operations and the collapse of its Mozambican distributor and Deli Foods subsidiary also negatively impacted the company in this period.  This led to then CEO Peter Matlare to resign in November 2015 and a reorganisation of its non-South African operations.

Current leadership 
Noel Doyle was appointed chief executive officer with effect from 1 February 2020. Pamela Padayachee was appointed acting Chief Financial Officer with effect from 1 February 2020.

Scandals

Listeriosis outbreak 

Tiger Brands was implicated in the world's largest listeriosis outbreak in March 2017 when polony produced at a factory in Polokwane‚ Limpopo by its subsidiary company, Enterprise Foods, was found to be the source of the outbreak by the South African National Institute for Communicable Diseases and announced by the Minister of Health. The outbreak caused the deaths of 164 people and infected a further 872 people by 24 February 2018. By 5 March 2018 a total of 180 people were thought to have died from the outbreak. Tiger Brands stated that they had been presented with no evidence of their facility being the cause of the outbreak. Following the announcement by the Minister of Health the company's stock price dropped by 7% resulting in R5.7bn (US$438.69 million) reduction in market capitalisation.

Price-fixing Scandals

Bread
In mid-November 2007 Tiger Brands was fined R98.8 million (roughly equivalent to US$12.8 million at the immediate spot exchange rate at the time) by the South African Competition Commission for colluding with other bread producers to raise the price of bread by between 30c and 35c per loaf.

According to the commission the four companies involved (Premier Foods, Tiger Brands, Foodcorp and Pioneer Foods) controlled more than 90 percent of the wheat flour market at the time. Facilitating their pricing activities through secret meetings and telephone calls between employees of these firms at various venues, including churches, stadiums and hotels. The commission also found that the price-fixing activities had a negative effect on both consumers as a whole as well as inhibiting smaller bakeries from being effective competitors.

The fine reflected 5.7% of Tiger Brand's bread sales, coming mostly from its Albany brand, for the 2006 financial year. Tiger Brands took full responsibility and then CEO Nick Dennis resigned.

Adcock Ingram Critical Care
In May 2008 Tiger Brands agreed to pay a R53.5 million fine for alleged anti-competitive practices in its health care subsidiary Adcock Ingram Critical Care (AICC). AICC executive Arthur Barnett was suspended until the investigation was concluded. In July 2008 Tiger Brands stated that it was going to unbundle its entire Adcock Ingram subsidiary with each Tiger Brands shareholder receiving one share in Adcock Ingram for every Tiger Brands share they owned.

Subsidiaries 
Over the years Tiger brands has acquired various subsidiary organisations:

Brands

Brand (country if not in South Africa, year of acquisition and/or launch)

See also
 List of companies of South Africa

References

External links
 Tiger Brands Limited Official Site

Manufacturing companies based in Johannesburg
Companies listed on the Johannesburg Stock Exchange
Food and drink companies of South Africa